Vapa may refer to:
 Vapa (Čačak), a village in Serbia
 Vapa (Sjenica), a village in Serbia

or:
 Vapa (river), a river in Serbia

See also
 VAPA, a protein